Procopio Herrera "Bobby" Rodriguez (July 26, 1926 – August 23, 2007), nicknamed "Tito",  was a Mexican Major League Baseball pitcher who played for the St. Louis Browns in .

External links

1926 births
2007 deaths
Baseball players from Tamaulipas
Major League Baseball pitchers
Major League Baseball players from Mexico
Mexican expatriate baseball players in the United States
St. Louis Browns players
Minor league baseball managers
Laredo Apaches players
Azules de Veracruz players
San Antonio Missions players
Tecolotes de Nuevo Laredo players
Tuneros de San Luis Potosí players